The tournament was played between January 1 and January 7, 2001. Lleyton Hewitt was the defending champion but lost in the quarterfinals to Tommy Haas.

Haas won in the final 6–3, 6–1 against Nicolás Massú.

Seeds

Draw

Finals

Top half

Bottom half

Qualifying

Seeds

Qualifiers

Draw

First qualifier

Second qualifier

Third qualifier

Fourth qualifier

References
 2001 AAPT Championships Draw
 2001 AAPT Championships Singles Qualifying Draw

Next Generation Adelaide International
2001 ATP Tour
2001 in Australian tennis